Fuel Juice Bars is a British chain of juice bars, with 28 outlets in the UK, as of April 2016.

In February 2015, Fuel topped the analysts Horizon's list of the fastest-growing "Ones to Watch" - restaurants or fast service concepts with fromfive to 25 outlets and an annual growth rate in outlet numbers of at least 20% over the past three years. Fuel Juice Bars have grown from eight units in 2011 to 24 in 2014.

References

External links
 

Juice bars
Fast-food franchises
British brands
Drink companies of the United Kingdom